

The Bleriot-SPAD S.32 was a record-breaking aircraft built in SPAD in the early 1920s.

Design
The S.32 was a biplane with a monocoque fuselage of wood and canvas construction. Its engine was equipped with a device to vary the compression ratio to reduce the power loss caused by altitude.

Specifications

See also

References

1920s French aircraft
SPAD aircraft
Biplanes
Single-engined tractor aircraft
Aircraft first flown in 1921